Mannini is an Italian surname. Notable people with the surname include:

Daniele Mannini (born 1983), Italian footballer
Federico Mannini (born 1992), Italian footballer
Jacopo Antonio Mannini (1646–1752), Italian Baroque painter
Moreno Mannini (born 1962), Italian footballer

Italian-language surnames